The 1956–57 Cypriot First Division was the 20th season of the Cypriot top-level football league. This year no relegation took place after an agreement between the clubs.

Overview
It was contested by 9 teams, and Anorthosis Famagusta FC won the championship. There was no relegation this season, because the league was expanded to 10 teams in the next season.

League standings

Results

References
Cyprus - List of final tables (RSSSF)

Cypriot First Division seasons
Cypriot First Division, 1956-57
1